School is a South Korean anthology series created by the KBS Drama Production Group for KBS2. The first season premiered in 1999, and the series lasted for four straight years (until 2002). After a ten-year hiatus, the franchise rebooted with a new season in 2012 tiled as School 2013. Since then 3 other series: Who Are You: School 2015, School 2017 and School 2021 were launched.

Background
School series is a Korean drama series about the struggles that students go through in course of their formative years in schools. It mainly focuses on portraying realistic issues that South Korea's youths faces, such as the corrupt education system, teen suicide, corporal punishment, academy and tutoring culture, career prospects and bullying.

The series has been noted for launching the careers of rookie actors.

Series overview

List of series

School 1
A drama about the problems adolescents face in schools, between study, first love and family, and how they struggle to overcome them.

School 2
The drama is centered around high school students who not only have to deal with school tasks but will also have to face the problems that come with being a youth such as first love, friendship, adversity not to mention the typical rebellion of youth because for them the school and their youth will be a great adventure.

School 3
A drama about the problems teens face in school, between study, first love and family, and how they struggle to overcome them.

School 4
The KBS youth drama is about the lives of the staff and students in Sewon Arts High School.

School 2013

Seungri High School ranks as one of the worst of the 178 high schools in Seoul based on academic scores. Seungri High School is now busy preparing presentations for its new students. Class 2 is at the bottom of grade 2 at Seungri High School. Go Nam-soon (Lee Jong-suk) is elected class president for grade 2, thanks to the support of Oh Jung-ho (Kwak Jung-wook), who is a member of the school gang. Kang Se-chan (Choi Daniel) is the top Korean language teacher at a famous institute in Gangnam. In order to improve the student's scores at Seungri High School, the school hires Se-chan. Now, Jung In-jae (Jang Na-ra) and Kang Sae-chan (Choi Daniel) becomes the homeroom teachers of the students whose philosophies are apparently at odds. Together, they manage Victory High's toughest class; facing bullies, academic underachievers, and demanding parents, as they help the students overcome their problems.

School 2015

Sekang High School is the most prestigious private high school in Seoul's Gangnam District, and Go Eun Byul (Kim So-hyun) is the most popular girl there. Meanwhile, her identical twin sister Lee Eun Bi is living in an orphanage and is being bullied at school. Then one day, Eun Byul mysteriously disappears. Soon after, Eun Bi loses her memories and is mistaken as being Eun Byul. Eun Bi then starts living her life as Eun Byul.

School 2017

Coming-of-age story about lives of 18-year-old high school students who are valued according to their ranking at Geumdo High School. Despite their frustrations, they find out how to make their own way in this world that seems to be a stagnant cycle of school and home. The plot follows a class of high school students attempting to overcome the stress of being ranked by their exam grades, and facing the difficulties of being a teenager in a high-pressure, corrupt system. Its central protagonist is Ra Eun-ho (Kim Se-jeong), a cheerful and kind-hearted 18-year-old who dreams of being a webtoon artist but is caught up in the search for a mysterious troublemaker in the school, known as 'Student X'. When she is accused of being Student X, her dream of going to university to study art is put at risk as she faces expulsion.

School 2021

The series tells the story of youths just turned 18, who choose a path rather than an entrance examination. It depicts school friends helping each other overcome the barriers that come up while taking a less chosen path. In the course they learn valuable lessons about life, love, and friendship.

Cast

See also
Reply, another long-running series from tvN (three seasons)
Ugly Miss Young-ae, another long-running series also from tvN (17 seasons)

References

External links
 
 
 
 

Korean-language television shows
Korean Broadcasting System television dramas
1999 South Korean television series debuts
2017 South Korean television series endings
1990s South Korean television series
2000s South Korean television series
2010s South Korean television series
1990s high school television series
2000s high school television series
2010s high school television series
1990s teen drama television series
2000s teen drama television series
2010s teen drama television series
Television series set in the 1990s
Television series set in the 2000s
Television series set in the 2010s
Television series about teenagers
South Korean high school television series
South Korean anthology television series